"Complex" is a song by British musician Gary Numan. It was the second single to be taken from his 1979 album The Pleasure Principle. The single reached number six in the UK Singles Chart.

The recording's backing track uses conventional acoustic drums, acoustic piano, and electric bass guitar, however the distinctive lead parts are performed on violin, viola, and heavily flanged and reverberated analogue monosynth, an unusual combination in popular music.

Lyrically, the song alludes to a psychological complex, expressing a paranoia that might have been directed at critics, fans, stalkers or false friends, depending on one's point of view:

Please keep them away
Don't let them touch me
Please don't let them lie
Don't let them see me

A BBC Radio 1 review panel speculated that this song was "the first electronic ballad", although this is untrue, as it post-dates recordings such as "Hiroshima Mon Amour" by Ultravox and "Neon Lights" by Kraftwerk by a couple of years.

Track listing
7" (Beggars Banquet BEG 29)

A. Complex - 3.10

B. Bombers (live version) - 5.47

12" (Beggars Banquet BEG 29 T)

A. Complex - 3.10

B1. Me! I Disconnect From You (Live Version)
  
B2. Bombers (live version) - 5.47

Live tracks recorded at Hammersmith Odeon, 28 September 1979.

Live versions

Numan rarely performed "Complex" in concert throughout the 1980s and 1990s, although versions appear on the re-released and expanded 1980 recordings captured on Living Ornaments '80, as well as the Micromusic video from his final Wembley Arena concert in 1981 and its CD counterpart Living Ornaments '81. He revived the song on stage in September 2003, as captured in the "Hope Bleeds" DVD and CD. "Complex" was also part of the setlist during the 2009 "The Pleasure Principle Live" concerts although it was the only track to have its position vis à vis the original album moved from between "Metal" and "Films" to between "Conversation" and "Cars".

1979 singles
Gary Numan songs
1979 songs
Beggars Banquet Records singles
Songs written by Gary Numan
1970s ballads
Synth-pop ballads